Handeland is a surname of Norwegian origin. Notable people with the surname include:

Gisle Handeland (born 1943), Norwegian politician
Lori Handeland (born 1961), American writer

References

Surnames of Norwegian origin